Isobel Veronica Marie Hadley-Kamptz (born 21 July 1976) is a Swedish journalist and author.

She writes columns for Dalarnas Tidningar, has participated in the TV8 show Studio Virtanen as a panel member for some episodes, and has published two books:  the novel Jag går bara ut en stund (2007) and the essay book Frihet och fruktan: Tankar om en ny liberalism (2011).

Bibliography
Jag går bara ut en stund (2007)
Frihet och fruktan: Tankar om en ny liberalism (2011)

References

Living people
Swedish journalists
1976 births